The R576 is a Regional Route in South Africa.

Route
Its western terminus is the R101 just south of Bela Bela (Warmbaths), it heads east-north-east, crossing the N1 to end at an intersection with the R516 near Settlers.

References

Regional Routes in Limpopo